On 8 October 2022, at 6:07 am, a fire broke out on the Crimean Bridge as a result of an explosion, which occurred on the road bridge, on or under the westbound vehicle lanes running from Russia to Kerch in occupied Crimea. Two two-lane vehicular spans of the bridge collapsed into the water. Two adjacent eastbound lanes on independent structure survived. The railway bridge was also significantly damaged by fire on railway tanker cars. Five people were killed and the Investigative Committee of Russia started an investigation.

The damage reduced the transport capacity of the bridge, which is being used to supply Russian troops in occupied Crimea during the invasion of Ukraine. The explosion occurred the day after the 70th birthday of Russian President Vladimir Putin and one week after the announcement of the annexation of four Ukrainian regions by Russia. No one claimed responsibility for the explosion. Volodymyr Zelenskyy said that the Ukrainian government "did not order" it.

Russian officials and a "senior Ukrainian official" speaking to The New York Times said the explosion was from a bomb loaded onto a truck. The BBC however claimed it was more likely caused by a maritime drone. Russian Federal Security Service has detained five Russian citizens and three people from Ukraine and Armenia accused of conducting the explosion.

Background 
The Crimean Bridge is a pair of parallel bridges, one carrying a four-lane road and the other a double-track railway, spanning the Kerch Strait between Russia on the east side and Crimea in Ukraine on the west side. Construction began in February 2016, following the Russian occupation and annexation of the Crimean peninsula in 2014. The Russian authorities called the construction of the bridge a "historic mission", one of the key tasks for the "final unification of Crimea with Russia". In May 2018, the road bridge was opened to traffic, and in December 2019, the rail bridge became operational.

During the 2022 Russian invasion, the bridge was used to supply the Russian Armed Forces in the southern theater of operations. While other methods of supplying resources to Crimea exist, including ports, the bridge is an important part of the infrastructure.

Ukrainian officials and military have repeatedly declared their intention to destroy the Crimean Bridge, considering it as a legitimate military target. Major General of the Armed Forces of Ukraine  stated in June 2022 that the bridge would become "target number one" as soon as Ukraine had weapons to attack it. In August 2022, Ukrainian presidential advisor Mykhailo Podolyak told The Guardian: "It's an illegal construction and the main gateway to supply the Russian army in Crimea. Such objects should be destroyed." In April 2022, Dmitry Medvedev, former President and Deputy Chairman of the Security Council of Russia, said: "One of the Ukrainian generals talked about the need to strike at the Crimean Bridge. I hope he understands what the retaliatory target will be."

Event 

On 8 October 2022 at 6:07 a.m. local time during low traffic, an explosion occurred on or near the westbound lanes of the road bridge, heading towards Kerch in Crimea, midway between the main arch span over the Kerch–Yenikale shipping channel and Tuzla Island, within Crimean territorial waters. As a result of the explosion, Kerch-bound spans of the roadway collapsed into the water. In the construction of the bridge, up to four spans are connected to form a longer section, and it appears that the damage has principally been to one such section, with three of its spans collapsing into the water and the fourth remaining in place. The press service of the Crimea Railway stated that at 6:05 their equipment showed an error on the railway tracks on the railway part of the bridge, and a fuel container wagon caught fire in the tail of the freight train. Wind from north blew flames and smoke towards the Black Sea.

Traffic by road, rail and sea were stopped, with long queues forming on land and sea. The explosion was not immediately reported by Russian authorities as an act of sabotage.

Initially, two possible causes of the fire were announced: the explosion of a fuel container wagon on the railway part of the bridge and the explosion of an automotive vehicle, probably a truck, on the road part.

Though no one claimed responsibility for the explosion, the Ukrainian media Ukrainska Pravda and UNIAN, citing their own sources, stated that it was a Security Service of Ukraine operation. The New York Times similarly wrote that a "senior Ukrainian official" "said that Ukraine’s intelligence services had orchestrated the attack and that it involved a bomb loaded onto a truck that drove across the bridge." Russia claimed that a bomb exploded while being carried by a truck going full speed using an improvised explosive device. However, according to the BBC, based on claimed security camera video released on social media, it is more likely that the explosion was caused by a maritime drone. With indications that an explosion directly damaged the road bridge and that its blast caused a fire on a train on the rail bridge, the presence of many sparks could indicate the use of thermite which burns hot enough to damage steel and ignite the flammable fuel in the train.

Later in the day the bridge reopened to light road traffic on one lane, with traffic alternating in each direction, and some rail traffic.

Impact

Casualties
The explosion killed five people, including those in an adjacent car.

Economic loss
Seven fuel tankers of a 59-wagon train destined for the Crimean Peninsula caught on fire due to the explosion. Over a hundred trucks waited on either side to use the small ferry, carrying 16 trucks at a time. Marine traffic was also hindered, as dozens of ships waited on either side of the bridge. Mikhail Razvozhayev, mayor of Sevastopol, initially imposed restrictions on the sale of groceries and forbade the sale of fuel in canisters but rescinded these measures for all of Crimea about an hour later, saying that supply lines were sufficient.

Structural damage
Three spans of the roadway deck on the Kerch-bound side were damaged with two collapsed into the water. In videos and satellite imagery, there was considerable discolouration of girders of the rail bridge. Two experts on bridge safety and blast engineering consider it likely that the fuel fire weakened the girders that support the rail bridge. The rail bridge supports a double-track railway, and Russia restarted traffic on the other rail track than the one containing the burned out fuel tankers almost immediately. The Russian Ministry of Transport reported that on the following day all rail freight and long-distance passenger trains were running to schedule.

The full repair of the bridge has been ordered, to be completed by 1 July 2023, with the contract awarded to Nizhneangarsktransstroy. On 9 November 2022, the UK Ministry of Defence released an intelligence update, saying: "Russian efforts to repair the Crimean bridge continue but it is unlikely to be fully operational until at least September 2023." According to intelligence, the road bridge was closed on 8 November 2022 to allow the movement and installation of a replacement 64-metre space. Three more spans will be required to replace the damaged sections. "Although Crimean officials have claimed these additional spans will be in place by 20 December, a briefing provided to President Putin added that works to the other carriageway would cause disruption to road traffic until March 2023."

Reactions

Ukrainian

The Ukrainian government's official Twitter account tweeted "sick burn" in response to the fire, while Mykhailo Podolyak, a Ukrainian presidential advisor, called the damage the "beginning": "Crimea, a bridge, the beginning. Everything illegal must be destroyed, everything stolen must be returned to Ukraine, everything occupied by Russia must be expelled."

The Ministry of Defense of Ukraine compared the destruction of the Crimean Bridge to the sinking of the cruiser Moskva writing: "The guided missile cruiser Moskva and the Kerch Bridge – two notorious symbols of Russian power in Ukrainian Crimea – have gone down. What's next in line, Russkies?".

Director of Ukrposhta Ihor Smilianskyi announced the release of a new stamp set dedicated to the event. There is also an artist's impression of the Crimean bridge explosion in Kyiv becoming a popular artwork.

Oleksiy Danilov, head of the National Security and Defence Council, posted a video of the bridge on social media, along with a video of Marilyn Monroe singing "Happy Birthday, Mr. President" to US President John F. Kennedy. The explosion occurred a day after the 70th birthday of Russian President Vladimir Putin.

Ukrainian President Volodymyr Zelenskyy said during his nightly address: "Today was not a bad day and mostly sunny on our state's territory. Unfortunately, it was cloudy in Crimea. Although it was also warm."

Russian 
The Russian occupation authorities of the Crimea accused the Ukrainian side. The spokeswoman of the Ministry of Foreign Affairs of the Russian Federation, Maria Zakharova, accused the "Kyiv regime" of terrorism, and a deputy of the State Duma, Andrey Gurulyov (United Russia), called on the commander-in-chief to "strongly respond".

Sergey Aksyonov, the Russian appointed head of Crimea, has indicated that they have enough food and fuel saying: "The situation is manageable – it's unpleasant, but not fatal". He also expressed a desire for revenge.

On 9 October, Putin stated: "There is no doubt. This is an act of terrorism aimed at destroying critically important civilian infrastructure… This was devised, carried out and ordered by the Ukrainian special services".

Kremlin propagandist Vladimir Solovyov urged retaliatory strikes across all Ukraine targeting "bridges, dams, railways, thermal power plants and other infrastructure facilities".

International 
The foreign minister of Estonia, Urmas Reinsalu, welcomed the explosion and suggested that Ukrainian special forces were behind it, recalling that the Ukrainian authorities had long called the Crimean Bridge a possible target for a strike.

Member of the European Parliament from Poland, Robert Biedroń (New Left) said: "A balm for the heart, especially since yesterday was Putin's birthday. It's good that Putin received such a gift. I hope he gets more. Ukrainians are destroying Russia's illegal infrastructure [in the occupied Crimea]".

Aftermath 
The Ministry of Transport of Russia announced that the ferry service across the Kerch Strait, which operated before the construction of the Crimean bridge, was being re-launched.

The Crimean Bridge is an important part of the transport connection between Russia and Crimea for the southern theater of operations of the Russo-Ukrainian War. The New York Times reported that the damage would create temporary logistical hurdles for Russian military movements, but heavy military equipment could be transported by the railway bridge.

On 8 October, the Russian foreign ministry published a video showing that the bridge was partially reopened to light vehicles. Trucks had to take the ferry, while trains had resumed, according to Russian state media. A week later, hundreds of trucks were waiting three–four days to use the ferry.

Putin ordered the security of the bridge to be placed under the control of Russia's Federal Security Service (FSB). The Deputy Prime Minister of Russia Marat Khusnullin said that the damaged portions of the bridge would be taken down and repairs were to commence immediately. On 9 October divers inspected the bridge structure for any underwater damage. The Russian government ordered the repairs to be completed by July 2023.

The road bridge was fully re-opened on 23 February 2023.

Effect on Russian forces
Russian forces have had their logistics hindered by the blast on the bridge. The UK Ministry of Defence said that transport "capacity [would] be seriously degraded" over the bridge. Repairs started on the evening of 8 October, with car and rail traffic resuming almost immediately. Trucks used ferries because one section of their lane was completely destroyed. The Russian reliance on rail to move military equipment means that truck traffic is not the major concern. There is also a land corridor along the coast of southern Ukraine, although this is at higher risk of attack. Construction of the bridge was completed in 2018, so it has only been relied upon for a few years. The greatest blow might be psychological, according to people comparing it to the sinking of the Russian cruiser Moskva and considering Putin's personal links to the bridge. Various analysts said on 10 October that trains would likely cross the bridge at reduced speed and loads.

Effect on Russian government
The symbolic nature of the destruction is no less important for the Kremlin. The opening of the bridge in 2018 was considered one of Putin's greatest propaganda achievements. After the Russian invasion of 2022, the structure was one of the most protected objects. A week before the explosion, a decree was signed on the annexation of four Ukrainian regions by Russia, after which Russia continued to threaten Ukraine with nuclear weapons in the event of an attack on objects in the annexed territories.

Putin said that the October 2022 missile strikes on Ukraine, which hit civilian areas in Kyiv and other cities, were in retaliation for Ukraine's alleged attack on the Crimean Bridge.

Investigation 
By order of Putin, a special commission was created to investigate the circumstances of the explosion, including representatives of the Ministry of Emergency Situations, the Ministry of Transport, the FSB, the Ministry of Internal Affairs and the National Guard. The Investigative Committee opened a criminal investigation into the explosion. Representatives of the special services drew attention to the shift that failed to detect the truck with explosives, despite the complexes installed at the entrance to the bridge to watch for suspicious cargo.

The National Anti-Terrorism Committee of Russia has reported:

On 10 October, the Russian chief investigator, Alexander Bastrykin, said: "We have already established the route of the truck".

On 11 October, FSB said five Russians and three people from Ukraine and/or Armenia were detained. It also said it detained a Ukrainian citizen involved in planning another bombing in Bryansk who is, according to FSB, now "cooperating with the investigation". The explosives were transported on 22 pallets on the truck. The explosives were loaded at Odessa at the beginning of August and shipped through Bulgaria, Armenia and Georgia to Russia. On 7 October, it was loaded onto a Russian truck bound for Simferopol. FSB released an X-ray video showing what they said was the truck loaded with explosives. In contrast with the photos from the bridge checkpoint released earlier, the X-rayed truck was missing a spare wheel and one of the axles. However, FSB said that more than one truck had been used in Russia to transport the cargo.

See also 

 2022 Russian strikes against Ukrainian infrastructure
 2022 Western Russia attacks
 Antonivka Road Bridge, Kherson Oblast
 Kerch Strait incident, 2018

Notes

References

External links 

 

2022 fires in Europe
Attacks in Europe in 2022
Attacks on bridges
Attacks on buildings and structures in 2022
Attacks on buildings and structures in Ukraine
Attacks on transport
Building and structure fires in Europe
Disasters in Crimea
Explosions in 2022
Explosions in Ukraine
Fires in Ukraine
Kerch Strait
October 2022 events in Russia
Crimean Bridge
Crimean Bridge
2022 disasters in Ukraine
Bridge disasters in Russia
Bridge disasters in Europe